The Van Baer family, also known as Van Baer van Lathum or Van Bahr Van Lathum, was a Middle Age noble family from Bahr and Lathum, in the Dutch province of Gelderland.

There was a Kasteel Baer (Castle Baer) in the 13th century.

References

External links 
 heren-van-baer at graafschap-middeleeuwen.nl (Dutch)
 Kasteel Baer at Dutch Wikipedia (Dutch)

County of Zutphen
Zevenaar